The 1996 Rhineland-Palatinate state election was held on 24 March 1996 to elect the members of the Landtag of Rhineland-Palatinate. The incumbent coalition government of the Social Democratic Party (SPD) and Free Democratic Party (FDP) led by Minister-President Kurt Beck retained its majority and continued in office.

Parties
The table below lists parties represented in the previous Landtag of Rhineland-Palatinate.

Election result

|-
|colspan=8| 
|-
! colspan="2" | Party
! Votes
! %
! +/-
! Seats 
! +/-
! Seats %
|-
| bgcolor=| 
| align=left | Social Democratic Party (SPD)
| align=right| 821,539
| align=right| 39.8
| align=right| 5.0
| align=right| 43
| align=right| 4
| align=right| 42.6
|-
| bgcolor=| 
| align=left | Christian Democratic Union (CDU)
| align=right| 798,166
| align=right| 38.7
| align=right| 0.0
| align=right| 41
| align=right| 1
| align=right| 40.6
|-
| bgcolor=| 
| align=left | Free Democratic Party (FDP)
| align=right| 184,426
| align=right| 8.9
| align=right| 2.0
| align=right| 10
| align=right| 3
| align=right| 9.9
|-
| bgcolor=| 
| align=left | Alliance 90/The Greens (Grüne)
| align=right| 142,665
| align=right| 6.9
| align=right| 0.4
| align=right| 7
| align=right| 0
| align=right| 6.9
|-
! colspan=8|
|-
| bgcolor=| 
| align=left | The Republicans (REP)
| align=right| 71,499
| align=right| 3.5
| align=right| 1.4
| align=right| 0
| align=right| ±0
| align=right| 0
|-
| bgcolor=|
| align=left | Others
| align=right| 45,431
| align=right| 2.2
| align=right| 
| align=right| 0
| align=right| ±0
| align=right| 0
|-
! align=right colspan=2| Total
! align=right| 2,063,726
! align=right| 100.0
! align=right| 
! align=right| 101
! align=right| ±0
! align=right| 
|-
! align=right colspan=2| Voter turnout
! align=right| 
! align=right| 70.8
! align=right| 3.1
! align=right| 
! align=right| 
! align=right| 
|}

1996
1996 elections in Germany